A novelogue is a story told almost exclusively through dialogue. Character descriptions, and settings are minimally provided.

History 

A "novel" or "prose novel" is defined as: "A novel is a book of long narrative in literary prose. The genre has historical roots both in the fields of the medieval and early modern romance and in the tradition of the novella. The latter supplied the present generic term in the late 18th century...

A novelogue is a combination between the words "novel" and "dialogue", and it is written more like a screenplay than a novel.  Prose are only used in brief segments of the story where character and setting descriptions are necessary.  Otherwise, the story is told through conversation.  Characters enter and exit as if moving around a world stage, like they would in a screenplay or stage play.

A novelogue is also considered a form of "dialogic storytelling".

References

External links
Novelogue.com
gradworks.umi.com

Fiction forms